Arthur Edward Cleeve Horne, (January 9, 1912 – July 5, 1998) was a Canadian portrait painter and sculptor.

Career
Born in Jamaica, British West Indies, Horne came to Canada with his parents in 1913. When he was around nine years of age, recovering from pneumonia, his mother gave him modelling clay to pass the time. He did a head of Shakespeare which won a prize at the Canadian National Exhibition. By age 15, he was exhibiting with the Royal Canadian Academy.

In Horne's early career, he wanted to become a portrait sculptor and studied under Dorothy Dick, a British sculptor (1927-1928). From 1931 to 1934, he attended the Ontario College of Art and Design, Toronto, first studying sculpture under Emanuel Hahn but soon changing to painting with J. W. Beatty. He also studied portrait and landscape painting under John Wentworth Russell (1934-1935). He was told by Emanuel Hahn, "A sculptor can never change his hand and become a painter." Horne, however, achieved much more acclaim as a painter than a sculptor.

Horne was primarily a society painter. He is thought to have painted over 400 portraits during his career ca.(1928–1991). His most notable subjects include Alexander Graham Bell, Claude Bissell, Bora Laskin, Pauline Mills McGibbon, Jeanne Sauvé, Colonel R. Samuel McLaughlin and John Diefenbaker among many others. He held his first exhibition in 1935, his second in 1937, and served as a camouflage officer in the army in the Second World War and retired with the rank of Captain. Cleeve Horne died at Toronto, Ontario, Canada of a respiratory-related illness in 1998.

Commissions
 Alexander Graham Bell, Brantford, Ont., 1948; 
 Wm Shakespeare, Stratford, Ont., 1950; 
 War Memorial, Law Society Upper Canada, Osgoode Hall, Toronto, 1951;
 bas-relief on Bank of Canada Building (Toronto), 1958.

Awards and honours
 1934 Awarded the Lieutenant Governor's Medal for Painting at the Ontario College of Art (first recipient)
 1963 Awarded the Royal Architectural Institute of Canada's Allied Arts Medal
 1965 Awarded the Royal Canadian Academy of Arts Medal
 1967 Awarded the Canadian Centennial Medal
 1977 Awarded the Queen Elizabeth II Silver Jubilee Medal
 1982 Awarded the Ontario Society of Artists Award
 1992 Awarded the 125th Anniversary of the Confederation of Canada Medal
 1984 Appointment as "fellow", Ontario College of Art & Design
 1987 Appointment to the Order of Ontario
 1996 Appointment as officer of the Order of Canada
 1999 Named "One of the Top 100 Portrait Artists of the 20th Century" by the Canadian Portrait Academy

Professional affiliations
Horne was a member of the Ontario Society of Artists and held the position of President from 1949-1951. He was also a member of the Royal Canadian Academy of Arts, Sculptors Society of Canada, the Canadian Portrait Academy and an Associate of the Ontario College of Art (AOCA).

Works

Personal life
Horne lived the majority of his life in Toronto. At the Ontario College of Art he met Jean Harris, a sculpture student; they married in 1939 and had three sons. The Hornes owned two houses that were both designed by prominent architectural firms. One was a permanent residence at 181 Balmoral Avenue in Toronto, built in 1952 and designed by Gordon Adamson. The other was a summer home at 1950 Concession 8 in Pickering, Ontario. The summer home was built in 1957 and designed by architects Michael Clifford and Kenneth Lawrie, and features a hyperbolic paraboloid roof.

Notes

External links
 Official website

1912 births
1998 deaths
20th-century Canadian painters
Canadian male painters
Officers of the Order of Canada
Members of the Order of Ontario
Members of the Royal Canadian Academy of Arts
Canadian portrait painters
20th-century Canadian sculptors
Emigrants from British Jamaica to Canada
20th-century Canadian male artists